Taba Chake (born 24 December 1993) is a Nyishi finger-style guitarist and singer-songwriter based in Mumbai. His debut EP titled Bond with Nature was released in 2016, with a 10-track album Bombay Dreams being released in 2019.

Early life 
Chake grew up in a village called Rono in Papum Pare. His parents never went to school and he describes his generation as "the first generation who grew up with buildings, telephones, roads and cars." He speaks and understands five languages: Nyishi, Hindi, English, Nepali and Assamese, and uses all of these in his music, however in 2008 he decided to prioritise the use of Nyishi to keep the language alive and present it to a wider audience. 

Chake started practicing music at the age of six and started writing songs at the age of 11. He left Arunchal Pradesh to study music in Bangalore in around 2010. Chake experimented with many genres of music as he matured, including playing guitar and composing music for a metal band, before joining a Hindi band, which he performed in from 2009 to 2011. Following its breakup, Chake started performing solo.

Career 
Chake's first album Bond with Nature was released in 2016. In around 2017, Chake won a scholarship to study music at the Swarnabhoomi Academy of Music in Chennai, but dropped out before graduating due to disliking the theoretical nature of the course.

Chake's second album Bombay Dreams was released in 2019. It features songs in English, Hindi and Nyishi, and revolves around themes of love, hope, unity and positivity. It is inspired by his move to Mumbai in 2018, and took him about a year and a half to record and release, with some songs featured (Meri Dastan and This is the Day) having taken eight years to develop. Bombay Dreams received 12.2 million streams across all platforms, and made it to No. 12 on Apple Music's All Genre Charts.

Chake released the single Blush in November 2020, conceived through listening to friends' stories about love and helped through his own emotions for a long-distance lover who lived in Delhi while he was in Mumbai. Blush was produced by Ritwik De, of instrumental rock band Zokokva, who also worked on Bombay Dreams.

Chake was chosen by Spotify for their emerging artist program RADAR, which assists him in promotion of his music through their app.

Discography

Studio albums 
 Bombay Dreams (2019)

EPs 
 Bond with Nature (2016)

Singles 
 Shaayad (2018)
 Blush (2020)
 Udd Chala (2023)

References 

Indian guitarists
1993 births
Living people
21st-century guitarists
21st-century male musicians
21st-century Indian musicians